The 2014 Atlantic Sun women's basketball tournament was the 36th edition of the Atlantic Sun Conference Championship. It took place from March 11, 2014 through March 16, 2014 in several arenas. All games took place at the higher of the two teams competing.

Format
The A-Sun Championship was a six-day single-elimination tournament. The top eight teams (with the exception of Northern Kentucky) competed in the championship. As part of their transition to Division I from Division II, Northern Kentucky was not eligible for post season play until 2017, including the A-Sun tournament. The winner of the tournament earned the A-Sun's automatic bid into the 2014 NCAA tournament.

Bracket

References

External links
Atlantic Sun Men's Basketball Championship Details

Tournament
ASUN women's basketball tournament